Nico Selenati (born 30 July 1996) is a Swiss cyclist, who currently rides for UCI Continental team .

Major results

Track

2013
 3rd Team pursuit, UEC European Junior Track Championships
2014
 1st  Team sprint, National Track Championships (with Jan Keller and Reto Müller)
 UEC European Junior Track Championships
2nd Madison
3rd Team pursuit
2016
 National Track Championships
1st  Team sprint (with Andreas Müller and Reto Müller)
2nd Elimination race
 3rd Scratch, UEC European Under-23 Track Championships
2017
 1st  Team pursuit, National Track Championships (with Claudio Imhof, Patrick Müller, Lukas Rüegg and Reto Müller)
2018
 UEC European Under-23 Track Championships
2nd Team pursuit
2nd Scratch
3rd Madison
 2nd Points race, National Track Championships

Road
2018
 5th International Rhodes Grand Prix

References

External links

1996 births
Living people
Swiss male cyclists
People from Uster
Cyclists at the 2019 European Games
European Games medalists in cycling
European Games bronze medalists for Switzerland
Sportspeople from the canton of Zürich